Turtle Talk with Crush is an interactive talk show type attraction that has appeared at several of the Disney theme parks. It first opened on November 16, 2004 at The Living Seas pavilion (later renamed The Seas with Nemo & Friends) at Epcot and later at Disney California Adventure in July 2005. The attraction opened in Hong Kong Disneyland from May 24 to August 10, 2008 as part of the "Nonstop Summer Fun" celebration. The attraction also opened in Tokyo DisneySea on October 1, 2009.

Designed by Walt Disney Imagineering in collaboration with Pixar, the attraction consists of an improvisational, real-time conversation with Crush, the green sea turtle from the 2003 Disney•Pixar film Finding Nemo.

A similar version is also featured in the Animator's Palate restaurant aboard Disney Cruise Line's Disney Dream and Disney Fantasy cruise ships. In addition, another Turtle Talk with Crush unit was donated to the new CHOC Bill Holmes Hospital by Walt Disney Imagineering during early 2013 to entertain the child patients and their siblings. This was the first attraction created by Imagineering to be placed in a non-Disney environment, but is operating twice a day by volunteering Cast Members (currently suspended since 2020). It was featured in the advertisement for the new Finding Nemo Submarine Voyage submarine-shaped tour in 2007 before the ride opened to the public in 2007.

Attraction description

Guests are admitted to a movie theater-like room featuring what appears to be a large aquarium-style window opening onto an undersea vista.  Children are encouraged to sit on a carpeted area up front so that they may have a better view, while parents and other adults sit on benches behind them.  The host and moderator gives a brief introduction to the show, and then Crush swims down to appear in the window.  Crush looks and sounds much as he does in Finding Nemo, complete with animated facial expressions and subtle gestures.  With the help of the moderator, Crush selects children and adults from the audience and engages them individually in dialogue, asking them questions and responding with quick wit and humor to questions about his life as a sea turtle or any other questions guests choose to ask. Crush individually chooses the children by saying what they are wearing (e.g.: "Oh hey, dudette in the pink shell (shirt) down on the sub floor, what is your name?").

Other events may occur during this improvised conversation, including cameo appearances by other characters from the original film and its sequel. Though the format, structure and rough duration of the show are consistent, the show itself varies considerably depending on the guests' questions and comments. For example, if an audience member asks where Dory is, a special ending involving Dory and Destiny will be triggered, complete with another attempt by Dory and her friend Destiny to speak whale. Crush will also refer to the Finding Nemo Submarine Voyage when asked where Nemo is, saying he is at the Tomorrowland Lagoon (where that attraction is).

Technology
The show is a blend of computer graphic techniques, image projection, and interactive improvisation.

The "Window to the Pacific" is a large rear-projection screen portraying an animated undersea environment.  The animated image of Crush is a computer graphic avatar controlled by a puppet, operated by a backstage actor/puppeteer whose performance is digitized in real time.  Crush's movements and voice-activated lip synch are rendered on the fly and are projected at 60 frames per second, so that the turtle's mouth moves in synchronization with the actor's words.  Digital puppetry techniques allow the puppeteer's movements to control the body motions of the projected turtle image. The technology enables each show to be different as Crush responds uniquely to each individual audience.

Using cameras mounted in the theater, the hidden actor can see the audience with whom he is interacting, and thus can refer to the specific appearance and behavior of particular questioners, as well as their location in the theatre.  The actor's performance is a combination of semi-scripted banter and improvised responses to guests' questions and comments, delivered in a mimicry of the character voice from the film (originally performed by Andrew Stanton). In 2016, Turtle Talk with Crush got an update to add characters from Finding Dory.

See also
 List of Epcot attractions (which includes history timelines)
 List of Disney California Adventure attractions
 Stitch Encounter, a Disney attraction in non-American Disney resorts that also includes unscripted, real-time conversation between park guests and an animated character
 Monsters, Inc. Laugh Floor, a Disney attraction in Magic Kingdom at Walt Disney World that also includes real-time interactions between park guests and animated characters
 Turtle Trek, a SeaWorld film projection theater

References

External links
 Epcot - Turtle Talk with Crush
 Disney California Adventure - Turtle Talk with Crush
 Tokyo DisneySea - Turtle Talk
 Turtle Talk With Crush Video

Walt Disney Parks and Resorts attractions
Disney California Adventure
Epcot
Hong Kong Disneyland
Tokyo DisneySea
Pixar in amusement parks
Finding Nemo
World Nature
Main Street, U.S.A.
Hollywood Land
American Waterfront (Tokyo DisneySea)
Amusement park attractions introduced in 2004
Amusement park attractions introduced in 2005
Amusement park attractions introduced in 2008
Amusement park attractions introduced in 2009
Amusement park attractions that closed in 2008
Future World (Epcot)
2004 establishments in Florida
2005 establishments in California
2009 establishments in Japan